Solomon Receiving the Queen of Sheba is a c. 1650 painting by Jacques Stella. It was acquired by the Museum of Fine Arts of Lyon in 1992, where it hangs with its pair Solomon Worshipping Idols.

Sources
Revue du Louvre [1992], (Acquisitions)

1650 paintings
Paintings by Jacques Stella
Paintings in the collection of the Museum of Fine Arts of Lyon
Stella